Vladislav Malkevich may refer to:
 Vladislav Malkevich (economist)
 Vladislav Malkevich (footballer)